The Câmp is a left tributary of the river Uz in Romania. It flows into the Uz in Sălătruc.

References

Rivers of Romania
Rivers of Bacău County